The South Salem Covered Bridge is a historic covered bridge in northwestern Ross County, Ohio, United States.  It was built in the 1870s and has been designated a historic site because of its well-preserved historic engineering.  Since its construction, it has carried Lower Twin Road over Buckskin Creek in Buckskin Township.  The bridge is a wooden Smith truss bridge, built in 1873 according to a design patented by Ohioan Robert Smith in the late 1860s.  Eight wooden panels wide, it rests on stone abutments and is covered with a metal roof.

In 1975, the bridge was listed on the National Register of Historic Places because of its historically significant engineering.  Key to its significance is its unique status: all other covered bridges in Ross County have been destroyed, leaving the South Salem bridge standing alone.

References

Bridges completed in 1873
Covered bridges on the National Register of Historic Places in Ohio
Buildings and structures in Ross County, Ohio
National Register of Historic Places in Ross County, Ohio
Transportation in Ross County, Ohio
Tourist attractions in Ross County, Ohio
Road bridges on the National Register of Historic Places in Ohio
Wooden bridges in Ohio
Truss bridges in the United States